Tere Jism se Jaan Tak is a Bollywood film made in Hindi language, directed by Raj Dayal and produced by Dhananjay Galani. It is made under the banner of Lavlin films and was released on 30 October 2015 all over India.

Plot 

Vikrant and Nisha have been dating for the past six months. He once took Nisha to his uncle's (Ramesh Goyal) farmhouse far from the city. After reaching there Vikrant tells Nisha that he will be the owner of this property soon but there are two conditions. First that he has to get married and second that he will have to prove he is not impotent. After living some days in that farmhouse, Nisha realizes that someone is watching both of them. She tells this to Vikrant but he does not believe her.

Vikrant's lawyer realizes that Vikrant and Nisha are not married and are lying. He makes a condition that they make love in front of him. Nisha agrees but Vikrant does not. Nisha learns that Vikrant had a girl in his life before Bobby. Nisha does not know where Bobby is right now and what happened between Vikrant and Bobby.

Cast 
 Nataliya Kozhenova
 Vinit Kakar
 Shilpa Sharma
 Shyam Bhimsaria
 Ramesh Goyal
 Dhananjay Galani

Technical team 
 Director: Raj Dayal
 Producer: Dhananjay Galani
 Story, Screen play & Dialogue: Subodh Nagdeve
 Music Director: Susheel Pendari

Music
 Music Director: Susheel Pendari 
 Lyrics: Subodh Nagdeve 
 Singer: Rajesh Dayal & Vaishali Phadke

Genres 
 Mystery, Romance

Release date
Tere Jism se jaan tak released on 30 October 2015

References

External links 
 https://www.imdb.com/title/tt5072666/ 
 https://www.youtube.com/watch?v=BzYFpeFHP6Y

2015 films
2010s Hindi-language films